Musselburgh Grammar School a state-funded secondary school in Musselburgh, East Lothian, Scotland. It serves as the main secondary school for Musselburgh and the surrounding areas of Wallyford and Whitecraig. The school dates back to the sixteenth century, and the present building was erected in 1835. Until the 1950s, Musselburgh Grammar was a fee-paying school. In 2005, the school's roll was 1310. Jodie Hannan is the current head teacher.

Primary schools
There are six nearby primary school which feed into Musselburgh Grammar School: Stoneyhill Primary School, Campie Primary School, Pinkie Primary School, Musselburgh Burgh Primary School, Whitecraig Primary School and Wallyford Primary School.

HMIE reports
In June 1999 the school was criticised following a Care and Welfare Inspection by Her Majesty's Inspectorate of Education. The report referred to having witnessed a battle between rival gangs in the school entrance area and that a third of pupils surveyed feared for their own safety. It also mentioned general weaknesses in safety, security, care and welfare, although the staff were praised for their efforts in the face of serious challenges. This led to a media furore with some newspapers describing the school as the worst in Scotland.

A follow up inspection in 2000 reported that the school and East Lothian Council had "responded promptly" and made "very good progress" in tackling the problems identified. The school also underwent a refurbishment of facilities between 2004 and 2005 under the PPP Scheme. 

The 2014 HMIE report expressed concern at the level of attainment of pupils, but in 2015, inspectors noted that the school had made improvements in this area and elsewhere.

House system
The school has a house system, which divides all pupils in the school into three different Houses when they start. The three houses are called Caird, Grange, and Moray.

There was a fourth house in the school called Seton which disbanded in 2011. House assemblies are held weekly and pupils enter a wide range of activities between Houses during the school year.

Notable former pupils

Rhona Cameron, comedian and writer
Susan Deacon, former Scottish Labour Party Member of the Scottish Parliament and Minister for Heath and Community Care until 2001.
David Macbeth Moir, physician and writer
Callum Beattie, singer-songwriter
Gary Anderson, professional darts player
Alex Hay, professional golfer, writer and former BBC sports commentator
Kenny Miller, football player
Colin Nish, football player
Jason Holt, football player
Kris Renton, football player
Kevin Smith, football player
Alan Morgan, football player
Kirsten Reilly, football player
Billy Brown, football player and manager
Jim Jefferies, football player and manager
John McGlynn, football player and manager
Ross Muir, professional snooker player
Jock Wallace Jr., football player and manager
Gordon Hunter, football player
Yvonne Murray, middle and long-distance runner
Robert Black, serial killer

References

http://www.eastlothiancourier.com/news/13592619.Improvements_made_at_Musselburgh_Grammar_School__say_inspectors

External links
School website
HMIE report May 2014

Secondary schools in East Lothian
Grammar schools in Scotland
Musselburgh